Frederick Tate may refer to:
Frederick Tate (cricketer) (1844–1935), English cricketer
Frederick Clarke Tate (1849–1920), farmer and political figure in Saskatchewan
Fred Tate (1867–1943), English cricketer
Fred Tate, fictional child prodigy in the film Little Man Tate

See also
Frederick Guthrie Tait (1870–1900), Scottish soldier and amateur golfer